Ministry of Foreign Affairs of the Republic of Iraq is a cabinet ministry of Iraq, responsible for conducting foreign relations of the country.

Organisation
Iraq maintains 86 Diplomatic missions worldwide.

List of ministers
The following is a list of foreign ministers of Iraq since 1924:

Kingdom of Iraq (1921–1958)
1924–1930: the prime ministers
1930–1931: Abdullah Bey al-Damluji
1931–1932: Jaafar al-Askari
1932–1933: Abdul Qadir Rashid
1933–1934: Nuri al-Said
1934: Abdullah Bey al-Damluji
1934: Tawfiq al-Suwaidi
1934–1936: Nuri al-Said
1936–1937: Naji al-Asil
1937–1938: Tawfiq al-Suwaidi
1938–1939: Nuri al-Said
1939–1940: Ali Jawdat al-Aiyubi
1940–1941: Nuri al-Said
1941: Ali Mahmud al-Shaykh
1941: Taha al-Hashimi
1941: Tawfiq al-Suwaidi
1941: Musa al-Shahbander
1941: Ali Jawdat al-Aiyubi
1941–1942: Sayyid Salih Jabr 
1942: Abdullah Bey al-Damluji 
1942: Dawood Al-Haidari 
1942: Nuri al-Said 
1942–1943: Abdul Ilah al-Hafiz
1943: Nasrat al-Farisi
1943: Abdul Ilah al-Hafiz
1943–1944: Mahmud Subhi al-Daftari
1944–1945: Arshad al-Umari
1945–1946: Hamdi al-Bajaji
1946: Tawfiq al-Suwaidi
1946: Ali Mumtaz
1946–1948: Muhammad Fadhel al-Jamali
1948: Hamdi al-Bajaji
1948: Nasrat al-Farisi
1948: Muzahim al-Bajaji
1948–1949: Ali Jawdat al-Aiyubi
1949: Abdul Ilah al-Hafiz
1949: Muhammad Fadhel al-Jamali
1949: Shakir al-Wadi
1949–1950: Muzahim al-Bajaji
1950: Tawfiq al-Suwaidi
1950–1951: Shakir al-Wadi
1951: Tawfiq al-Suwaidi
1951–1952: Shakir al-Wadi
1952: Muhammad Fadhel al-Jamali
1953: Tawfiq al-Suwaidi
1953–1954: Abdullah Bakr
1954: Musa al-Shahbander
1954: Muhammad Fadhel al-Jamali
1954–1955: Musa al-Shahbander
1955–1957: Burhanuddin Bashayan
1957: Ali Jawdat al-Aiyubi
1957–1958: Burhanuddin Bashayan
1958: Muhammad Fadhel al-Jamali
1958: Tawfiq al-Suwaidi

Iraqi Republic (1958–1968)
1958–1959: Abdul Jabbar Jomard
1959–1963: Hashem Jawad
1963: Talib Shabib
1963: Salih Mahdi Ammash
1963–1964: Subhi Abdul Hamid
1964–1965: Naji Talib
1965: Abdul Rahman al-Bazzaz
1965–1967: Adnan Pachachi
1967–1968: Ismail Khairallah

Ba'athist Iraq (1968–2003)
1968: Nasser al-Hani
1968–1971: Abdul Karim al-Shaikhly
1971: Rashid al-Rifai
1971–1974: Murtada Said Abdel Baki al-Hadithi
1974: Shathel Taqa
1974: Hisham al-Shawi 
1974–1983: Sa'dun Hammadi
1983–1991: Tariq Aziz
1991–1992: Ahmad Husayn Khudayir as-Samarrai
1992–2001: Muhammad Saeed al-Sahhaf
2001: Tariq Aziz 
2001–2003: Naji Sabri

Republic of Iraq (2004–present)

References

External links
 Iraq Ministry of Foreign Affairs official website

Foreign relations
Foreign relations of Iraq
Iraq